William Baeten (born 7 February 1997) is a Belgian professional footballer who plays as a central  midfielder for Liga I club FC U Craiova 1948.

Honours 
FC U Craiova
 Liga II: 2020–21

References

External links
 

Living people
1997 births
Belgian footballers
People from Houthalen-Helchteren
Footballers from Limburg (Belgium)
Association football midfielders
Belgian National Division 1 players
K.F.C. Dessel Sport players
K. Patro Eisden Maasmechelen players
Liga I players
Liga II players
FC U Craiova 1948 players
Belgian expatriate sportspeople in Romania
Expatriate footballers in Romania